Leucosporidiella is a genus of fungi found in the family Leucosporidiaceae. It contains 3 species.

References

External links

Basidiomycota genera
Leucosporidiales